The Association of German National Jews (German: Verband nationaldeutscher Juden) was a German Jewish organization during the Weimar Republic and the early years of Nazi Germany that eventually came out in support of Adolf Hitler.

History, goals, outcome
The Association of German National Jews was founded in 1921 by Max Naumann, who was its chairman until 1926 and again from 1933 to 1935, when the association was dissolved. The association was close to the national conservative and monarchist German National People's Party which, however, refused affiliation to the Association.

The goal of the Association was the total assimilation of Jews into the German Volksgemeinschaft, self-eradication of Jewish identity, and the expulsion from Germany of Jewish immigrants from Eastern Europe. Naumann was especially opposed to Zionists and Eastern European Jews. He considered the former a threat to Jewish integration and carriers of a "racist" ideology serving British imperial purposes. He saw the latter as racially and spiritually inferior.

The association's official organ was the monthly Der nationaldeutsche Jude edited by Max Naumann. The magazine had a circulation of 6,000 in 1927.

Among the activities of the Association was the fight against the Jewish boycott of German goods. It also issued a manifesto that stated that the Jews were being fairly treated.

In 1934 the Association made the following statement:

We have always held the well-being of the German people and the fatherland, to which we feel inextricably linked, above our own well-being. Thus we greeted the results of January 1933, even though it has brought hardship for us personally.

A possible reason why some German Jews supported Hitler may have been that they thought that his antisemitism was only for the purpose of "stirring up the masses".

The seemingly ironic fact that a Jewish association advocated loyalty to the Nazi programme gave rise to a contemporary joke about Naumann and his followers ending their meeting by giving the Nazi salute and shouting "Down With Us!".

Despite the extreme patriotism of Naumann and his colleagues, the German government did not accept their goal of assimilation. The Association of German National Jews was declared illegal and dissolved on 18 November 1935. Naumann was arrested by the Gestapo the same day and imprisoned at the Columbia concentration camp. He was released after a few weeks, and died of cancer in May 1939.

See also
 Hans-Joachim Schoeps and The German Vanguard (Der Deutsche Vortrupp)
 Internalized oppression
 Internalized racism
 Respectability politics
 Self-hating Jew

References

Further reading
 
 
 
 
 

1921 establishments in Germany
1935 disestablishments in Germany
Antisemitism in Germany
German nationalist organizations
Jewish anti-Zionism in Germany
Jewish anti-Zionist organizations
Jewish collaboration with Nazi Germany
Jewish organisations based in Germany
Organizations disestablished in 1935
Organizations established in 1921
Racism in Germany
Xenophobia in Europe